Fakers is a 2004 British film directed by Richard Janes and starring Matthew Rhys as con-man with a big debt to pay off to wanna-be crime lord Art Malik. It was produced by Richard Janes Claire Bee and Todd Kleparski, three graduates from Ravensbourne College of Design and Communication. Completely funded via independent routes the film cost $1,500,000 to make and has opened theatrically in the United Kingdom, America and Japan as well as other territories. The title track was written and performed by Andrea Britton and produced by Andrew J Jones.

Plot
In this crime caper set in the eccentric London art world, Nick Edwards (Rhys) owes £50,000 to the super-smooth, yet brutal, crime lord Foster Wright (Malik) and has four days to find the cash.

Nick knows nothing about working a heist of that size, but when he stumbles across a lost sketch by the legendary Italian artist Antonio Fraccini, he believes he's in the clear. The problem is, it's only worth 15 grand.

With the help of the eternal cynic Eve (Ashfield) and her extremely talented yet naïve artist brother Tony (Chambers), the plan is hatched; to forge the drawing and sell it to five Mayfair galleries within an hour before anyone catches onto the fact there's a scam going down.

External links

2004 films
2004 comedy films
British comedy films
Films set in London
Films shot in Barcelona
2004 directorial debut films
2000s English-language films
2000s British films